Songjiang South Railway Station is a metro station on Line 9 of the Shanghai Metro, and also serves as the line's southern terminus. It began operation on 30 December 2012. It is adjacent to Songjiang South railway station.

References

External links

Railway stations in Shanghai
Shanghai Metro stations in Songjiang District
Railway stations in China opened in 2012
Line 9, Shanghai Metro